Lieutenant-General Maurice Bocland ( 1695 – 15 August 1765) of Knighton Gorges in the parish of Newchurch, Isle of Wight, was a British soldier and Member of Parliament.

Biography
He was the second son of Maurice Bocland (1648–1710) of Standlynch, by his wife Mabel Dillington, daughter and (in her issue) heiress of Sir Robert Dillington, 2nd Baronet of Knighton Gorges. He was commissioned as a cornet in the 5th Dragoon Guards in 1715, and was promoted to lieutenant in 1716 and captain-lieutenant in the 1st Dragoon Guards in 1719.

Bocland succeeded to the family estate in Wiltshire on the death of his brother Philip, but sold it in 1726 and moved to Hampshire. He was first elected to Parliament for Yarmouth at a by-election in 1733, then for Lymington at the general election in 1734, for Yarmouth again in 1741, and for Newport in 1747. In Parliament he supported the Government.

In his military career, Bocland transferred from the cavalry to the infantry in 1738, when he was promoted to captain in the 1st Regiment of Foot Guards, ranking as a lieutenant-colonel. He served in the War of the Austrian Succession in Flanders from 1743 to 1746; he was wounded at the Battle of Fontenoy in 1745 and promoted to major in the same year. In 1747 he was made colonel of the 11th Regiment of Foot, an appointment he would hold until his death.

Bocland succeeded his maternal aunt to the estate of Knighton in 1749, and was made Captain of Carisbrooke Castle in 1752. He was not elected to Parliament in the general election of 1754, but continued his advance in the Army with promotion to major-general in 1755 and lieutenant-general in 1758.

By his first wife, Jane Fox (d. 25 February 1741), Bocland had five sons and two daughters. He married secondly on 4 November 1741, Sophia Bisset, a daughter of Major Bisset of Southampton, without issue. Knighton Gorges passed to his grandson Maurice George Bisset (1757–1821) the son of his daughter Jane Bockland by her husband Rev. Alexander Bissett (the son of Major William Bisset, the second son of Alexander Bisset, 13th feudal baron of Lessendrum, Aberdeen, Scotland).

References
 Paula Watson, BOCLAND, Maurice (c.1695-1765), of Lymington, Hants. in The History of Parliament: the House of Commons 1715-1754 (1970).

1690s births
1765 deaths
Military personnel from Wiltshire
British Army lieutenant generals
1st King's Dragoon Guards officers
5th Dragoon Guards officers
Grenadier Guards officers
Devonshire Regiment officers
British Army personnel of the War of the Austrian Succession
British MPs 1727–1734
British MPs 1734–1741
British MPs 1741–1747
British MPs 1747–1754
Members of Parliament for the Isle of Wight
People from Wiltshire